Garradunga is a rural locality in the Cassowary Coast Region, Queensland, Australia.

Geography
Garradunga is located north of Innisfail.

History 
It has been suggested that the locality takes its name from its railway station, which was named on 10 October 1918 by the Queensland Railways Department, using an Aboriginal word meaning feasting place on a ridge. However, the name was already in use in the area prior to that time. 

Garradunga Provisional School opened circa June 1902 and closed later that year due to low student numbers. It reopened in 1903 but low student numbers resulted in it being closed permanently in 1904.

Garradunga Post Office opened on 1 April 1925 (a receiving office had been open from 1923, and between 1901 and 1906).

In the 2011 census, Garradunga had a population of 329 people.

Heritage listings
Garradunga has a number of heritage-listed sites, including:
 McCowat Road: McCowat's Farm

References

Cassowary Coast Region
Localities in Queensland